Roy Maxwell White (18 October 1917 – 19 January 1980) was a New Zealand rugby union player. A flanker, White represented  at a provincial level, and was a member of the New Zealand national side, the All Blacks, in 1946 and 1947. He played 10 matches for the All Blacks including four internationals. He captained the side once, in a mid-week game against a New South Wales XV during the 1947 tour of Australia.

References

1917 births
1980 deaths
Rugby union players from Dannevirke
People educated at Hastings Boys' High School
New Zealand rugby union players
New Zealand international rugby union players
Wellington rugby union players
Rugby union flankers